Philandersbron is a town in the Dawid Kruiper Local Municipality within the ZF Mgcawu District Municipality in the Northern Cape province of South Africa. It has a population of 1,081; 99.07% of those speak Afrikaans. The town is mostly comprised (93.80%) of Coloured people with small percentages of Black African 3.89% and White (1.67%) people. 35.1% of residents are 14 or under.

A small primary school is located in the town along with a public health clinic.

References

Populated places in the Dawid Kruiper Local Municipality